The 351st Missile Wing is an inactive United States Air Force unit, which was last based at Whiteman Air Force Base, Missouri.   Assigned to Strategic Air Command for most of its existence, the wing maintained LGM-30F Minuteman II ICBMs in a state of readiness to fire, pursuant to any launch orders that might be received from the National Command Authority. It was inactivated in 1995.

During World War II, its predecessor unit, the 351st Bombardment Group was a VIII Bomber Command Boeing B-17 Flying Fortress unit. Flying from RAF Polebrook in Northamptonshire in early 1943, the group's 504th Bomb Squadron made 54 consecutive missions in June 1943 to January 1944 without losses. Two members of the 351st Bombardment Group, Second Lieutenant Walter E. Truemper and Staff Sergeant Archibald Mathies, were posthumously awarded the Medal of Honor for a mission to Leipzig, Germany, on 20 February 1944.  Fellow Crew member Carl Moore earned the Distinguished Service Cross for his actions during the mission.  Additionally, the crew earned a Silver Star and seven Purple Hearts, which made them the most decorated B-17 crew of the Eighth Air Force in World War Two.

The 351st was also the unit to which Captain Clark Gable was assigned. Gable flew five combat missions, including one to Germany, as an observer-gunner in B-17 Flying Fortresses between 4 May and 23 September 1943, earning the Air Medal and the Distinguished Flying Cross for his efforts.

History

World War II

The 351st Bombardment Group was activated 1 October 1942 at Salt Lake City AB, Utah. The group established at Geiger Field in Washington in November 1942 where the Group was assembled for initial training, and the Second phase of training was conducted at Biggs Field, Texas, between December 1942 and March 1943. The unit then moved to Pueblo AAB, Colorado for preparation for overseas movement. The ground unit left Pueblo for New York on 12 April 1943. The aircraft began movement on 1 April 1943. In April–May 1943, the unit moved to RAF Polebrook England to serve in combat with Eighth Air Force. It was assigned to the 94th Combat Wing, also at Polebrook. The group tail code was a "Triangle J".

The 351st's first completed combat mission took place on 14 May 1943, when 18 B-17's targeted a German Luftwaffe airfield at Kortrijk, Belgium. As the war progressed, the 351st operated primarily against strategic objectives in Germany, striking such targets as ball-bearing plants at Schweinfurt, communications at Mayen, marshalling yards at Koblenz, a locomotive and tank factory at Hanover, industries at Berlin, bridges at Cologne, an armaments factory at Mannheim, and oil refineries at Hamburg.

The group also struck harbor facilities, submarine installations, airfields, V-weapon sites, and power plants in France, Belgium, the Netherlands, and Norway.

The 351st Received a Distinguished Unit Citation (DUC) for performance on 9 October 1943, when an aircraft factory in Germany was accurately bombed in spite of heavy flak and pressing enemy interceptors. It received another DUC for its part in the successful attack of 11 January 1944, on aircraft factories in central Germany. The group participated in the intensive air campaign against the German aircraft industry during "Big Week", 20–25 February 1944.

In addition to its strategic missions, the group often operated in support of ground forces and attacked interdictory targets. Bombed in support of the Battle of Normandy in June 1944 and the Saint-Lô breakthrough in July. The group hit enemy positions to cover the airborne attack on the Netherlands in September 1944 and subsequently struck front-line positions, communications, and airfields to help stop the German counteroffensive in the Battle of the Bulge, December 1944 – January 1945. The 351st later flew missions in support of Operation Varsity, the airborne assault across the Rhine in March 1945.

The 351st conducted routine Eighth Air Force missions from RAF Polebrook until the end of the war. The unit completed 311 combat missions from Polebrook. The 351st lost 175 B-17's and their crews. The gunners in the Group fired off 2,776,028 rounds of ammunition and were credited with destroying 303 enemy aircraft.

The Group was redeployed to the US in May and June 1945. The first aircraft left on 21 May 1945. The ground unit sailed for the US on 25 June 1945, aboard the Queen Elizabeth. The ship docked in the US in July 1945, but the group was not inactivated until 28 August 1945.

Cold War
During the early years of the Cold War, the 351st Bombardment Group (Very Heavy) was reactivated for a short period between 1947 and 1949 as part of the reserves.

Later during the Cold War, the United States Air Force and Strategic Air Command established the 351st Strategic Missile Wing, which stood alert with Minuteman I and later, Minuteman II ICBMs starting in 1963 at Whiteman AFB, Missouri.   The wing was bestowed the lineage, honors and history of the USAAF 351st Bomb Group of World War II upon activation.

The 351st supervised missile training operations and coordinated construction of SM-30B (later, LGM-30B) Minuteman I missile facilities from 1 February 1963, to 29 June 1964.  The first missile arrived 14 January 1964 and was placed its silo two days later.  The 508th Strategic Missile Squadron became combat ready on 5 June and the 509th on 10 June 1964.  The last flight of the fifteen missiles was accepted 29 June 1964, making the 510th operational.  The wing then had 150 fully operational missiles. Two-officer missile combat crews were deployed to each of the LCCs for 24-hour shifts. Meanwhile, the 340th Bombardment Wing phased down for inactivation and 351st Strategic Missile Wing gradually assumed host-wing responsibilities at Whiteman AFB, between 1 July and 1 September 1963. Later, the Wing converted to LGM-30F Minuteman II missiles between 7 May 1966, and 3 October 1967.

The wing won the Colonel Lee R. Williams Memorial Missile Trophy for Calendar Years 1965, 1967 and 1973, as well as the SAC missile combat competition and Blanchard Trophy in 1967, 1971, 1977, 1981, 1989, and 1993. It was named SAC's "Best Minuteman Wing" in 1972.

On 1 September 1991, the wing was redesignated as the 351st Missile Wing and implemented the objective wing organization.  It was relieved from SAC in advance of SAC's disestablishment and reassigned to Eighth Air Force in the new Air Combat Command on 1 June 1992.   It was again reassigned on 1 July 1993 to the Air Force Space Command and assigned to the new Twentieth Air Force.  The same day, it relinquished "host wing" responsibilities for Whiteman AFB, transferring that role to Air Combat Command's 509th Bomb Wing, operating the B-2 Spirit strategic bomber.

The 351st Missile Wing and its three squadrons of Minuteman II ICBMs were inactivated on 31 July 1995 as a result of planned phaseout of the Minuteman II.

Lineage
 351st Bombardment Group
 Constituted as the 351st Bombardment Group (Heavy) on 25 September 1942
 Activated on 1 October 1942
 Redesignated 351st Bombardment Group, Heavy on 11 August 1944
 Inactivated on 28 August 1945
 Redesignated 351st Bombardment Group, Very Heavy
 Activated on 9 April 1947
 Inactivated on 27 June 1949
 Consolidated with the 351st Strategic Missile Wing as the 351st Strategic Missile Wing on 31 January 1984

 351st Missile Wing
 Established as 351st Strategic Missile Wing (ICBM—Minuteman) and activated, on 9 August 1962
 Organized on 1 February 1963
 Consolidated with the 351st Bombardment Group on 31 January 1984
 Redesignated as 351st Missile Wing on 1 September 1991
 Inactivated on 31 July 1995

Assignments
 II Bomber Command, 1 October 1942 – 12 April 1943
 1st Bombardment Wing, May 1943 (attached to 101st Provisional Combat Bombardment Wing until 13 September 1943)
 94th Combat Bombardment Wing, 1 November 1943 – 23 June 1945
 Army Service Forces (for inactivation),  – 28 July August 1945
 Tenth Air Force, 9 April 1947 – 27 June 1949
 Strategic Air Command, 9 August 1962 (not organized)
 17th Strategic Aerospace Division (later 17th Strategic Missile Division, 17th Strategic Aerospace Division), 1 February 1963
 4th Strategic Missile Division (later 4th Air Division), 30 June 1971
 40th Air Division, 1 July 1973
 19th Air Division, 1 December 1982
 Eighth Air Force, 13 June 1988
 100th Air Division, 1 July 1990
 Eighth Air Force, 26 July 1991
 Twentieth Air Force, 1 September 1991 – 31 July 1995

Units
 Groups
 351st Operations Group, 1 September 1991 – 31 July 1995

 Squadrons
 508th Bombardment (later Strategic Missile, Missile) Squadron, 1 October 1942 – 28 August 1945; 15 October 1947 – 27 June 1949; 1 May 1963 – 1 September 1991
 509th Bombardment (later Strategic Missile, Missile) Squadron, 1 October 1942 – 28 August 1945; 9 May 1947 – 3 May 1948; 1 June 1963 – 1 September 1991
 510th Bombardment (later Strategic Missile, Missile) Squadron, 1 October 1942 – 28 August 1945; 15 September 1947 – 3 May 1948; 1 June 1963 – 1 September 1991
 511th Bombardment Squadron, 1 October 1942 – 28 August 1945; 15 October 1947 – 27 June 1949

Stations
 Salt Lake City Army Air Base, Utah, 1 October 1942
 Geiger Field, Washington, November 1942
 Biggs Field, Texas, December 1942
 Pueblo Army Air Base, Colorado, c. 1 March – c. 12 April 1943
 RAF Polebrook (AAF-110), England, c. 1 May 1943 – June 1945
 Sioux Falls Army Air Field, South Dakota,  – 28 July August 1945
 Scott Field, Illinois, 9 April 1947 – 27 June 1949
 Whiteman Air Force Base, Missouri, 1 February 1963 – 31 July 1995

Aircraft and missiles
 B-17 Flying Fortress, 1942–1995
 B-29 Superfortress, 1947–1949
 LGM-30B Minuteman I, 1963–1967
 LGM-30F Minuteman II, 1966–1995

LGM-30F Minuteman III Missile Alert Facilities (MAF) (each controlling 10 missiles) are located as follows:
 508th Missile Squadron
 A-01 3.5 mi SE of Blackburn MO,       
 B-01 38.1 mi ExNE of Houstonia MO,    
 C-01 5.6 mi SxSW of Pilot Grove MO,   
 D-01 6.1 mi SE of Syracuse MO,        
 E-01 7.3 mi WxSW of Florence MO,      
 509th Missile Squadron
 G-01 7.4 mi WxNW of Lowry City MO,    
 H-01 2.8 mi WxSW of Eldorado Springs MO  
 J-01 4.7 mi NxNW of Rockville MO,     
 K-01 6.3 mi WxSW of Adrian MO,        
 L-01 8.8 mi NE of Adrian MO,          
 510th Missile Squadron
 F-01 6.0 mi SE of Windsor MO,         
 I-01 6.7 mi W of Calhoun MO,          
 M-01 32.6 mi ExNE of Holden MO,       
 N-01 3.9 mi ExSE of Odessa MO,        
 *O-01 On Whiteman AFB, MO	         
 *Preserved, but not open to the public.

See also

 351st Missile Wing LGM-30 Minuteman Missile Launch Sites

References

Notes

Citations

Bibliography

External links
 Whiteman AFB Minuteman Missile Site Coordinates
 351 BG(H), US 8th Air Force, W.W.II
 351st Bombardment Group at Polebrook
 History of the 351st
 Eighth Air Force Historical Society 351st Bombardment Group
 History of the 315st Bomb Group Heavy

351
Military units and formations established in 1942
Military units and formations disestablished in 1995